UFC Fight Night 224 (also known as UFC on ESPN+ 82) is an upcoming mixed martial arts event produced by the Ultimate Fighting Championship that will take place on May 13, 2023, at a TBD venue and location.

Background 
A light heavyweight bout between former UFC Light Heavyweight Championship challenger Anthony Smith and Johnny Walker is expected to headline the event. 

A women's flyweight bout between Kim Ji-yeon and Mandy Böhm is expected to take place at the event. They were previously scheduled to meet at UFC Fight Night: Lewis vs. Spivak, but Böhm was forced to withdraw due to illness.

Announced bouts 
Light Heavyweight bout: Anthony Smith vs. Johnny Walker
Women's Bantamweight bout: Jessica-Rose Clark vs. Tainara Lisboa
Welterweight bout: Matt Brown vs. Court McGee
Heavyweight bout: Jailton Almeida vs. Jairzinho Rozenstruik
Women's Strawweight bout: Mackenzie Dern vs. Angela Hill
Welterweight bout: Jake Matthews vs. Gabe Green
Bantamweight bout: Douglas Silva de Andrade vs. Cody Stamann
Women's Flyweight bout: Kim Ji-yeon vs. Mandy Böhm

See also 

 List of UFC events
 List of current UFC fighters
 2023 in UFC

References 

 

UFC Fight Night
2023 in mixed martial arts
Scheduled mixed martial arts events